Mark Robert McNamara (June 8, 1959 – April 27, 2020) was an American professional basketball player who was selected by the Philadelphia 76ers in the first round (22nd pick overall) of the 1982 NBA draft.

A 6'11" power forward-center from the University of California, Berkeley, McNamara played in eight NBA seasons from 1982 to 1985 and from 1986 to 1991. He played for the 76ers, San Antonio Spurs, Kansas City Kings, Los Angeles Lakers and Orlando Magic. McNamara also dabbled in acting and appeared in the 1985 TV movie "Ewoks: The Battle for Endor".

NBA career
Drafted by the Philadelphia 76ers, he spent his rookie season with the team. Playing alongside Moses Malone, McNamara averaged 2.2 points and 2.1 rebounds per game across 36 games, and earned his only NBA championship with the 76ers.

McNamara's best statistical year as a professional came during the 1983–84 season as a member of the Spurs, appearing in 70 games and averaging 5.5 ppg and 4.5 rpg.

In his NBA career, McNamara played in 278 games and scored a total of 980 points.

Post-NBA
McNamara was an assistant coach of the boys' basketball team at Haines High School in Haines, Alaska and led the team to two state titles. McNamara helped with basketball camps around Alaska.

Death
McNamara died on April 27, 2020 at age 60. He reportedly died of heart failure, culminating from years of cardiac issues.

NBA career statistics

Regular season

|-
|style="text-align:left;background:#afe6ba;"|†
|style="text-align:left;"|Philadelphia
|36||2||5.2||.453||–||.444||2.1||.2||.1||.1||2.2
|-
|style="text-align:left;|
|style="text-align:left;"|San Antonio
|70||3||14.8||.621||–||.471||4.5||.4||.2||.2||5.5
|-
|style="text-align:left;"|
|style="text-align:left;"|San Antonio
|12||0||5.3||.667||–||.500||1.4||.0||.2||.1||2.8
|-
|style="text-align:left;"|
|style="text-align:left;"|Kansas City
|33||0||6.4||.483||–||.523||1.7||.2||.2||.2||2.4
|-
|style="text-align:left;"|
|style="text-align:left;"|Philadelphia
|11||1||10.3||.467||–||.368||3.3||.2||.1||.0||3.2
|-
|style="text-align:left;"|
|style="text-align:left;"|Philadelphia
|42||18||13.8||.391||–||.727||3.7||.4||.1||.3||3.6
|-
|style="text-align:left;"|
|style="text-align:left;"|L.A. Lakers
|39||0||8.2||.500||–||.628||2.6||.3||.1||.1||2.9
|-
|style="text-align:left;"|
|style="text-align:left;"|L.A. Lakers
|33||1||5.8||.442||–||.650||1.9||.1||.1||.0||3.1
|-
|style="text-align:left;"|
|style="text-align:left;"|Orlando
|2||0||6.5||.000||–||–||2.0||.0||.0||.0||.0
|- class=sortbottom
|style="text-align:center;" colspan=2|Career
|278||25||9.7||.512||–||.548||3.0||.3||.1||.1||3.5

Playoffs

|-
|style="text-align:left;background:#afe6ba;"| 1983†
|style="text-align:left;"|Philadelphia
|2||0||1.0||1.000||–||–||.5||.0||.0||.0||2.0
|-
|style="text-align:left;"|1987
|style="text-align:left;"|Philadelphia
|1||0||2.0||1.000||–||–||1.0||.0||.0||.0||2.0
|-
|style="text-align:left;"|1989
|style="text-align:left;"|L.A. Lakers
|3||0||2.3||.500||–||.500||.3||.0||.0||.0||1.0
|-
|align=left|1990
|align=left|L.A. Lakers
|2||0||2.5'||.250||–||–||.5||.0||.0||.0||1.0
|- class="sortbottom"
|style="text-align:center;" colspan=2|Career
|8||0||2.0||.556||–||.500||.5||.0||.0||.0||1.4

 Film 

McNamara worked as a stand-in for Peter Mayhew as Chewbacca on the set of Return of the Jedi''.

References

External links
Basketball-reference.com page

1959 births
2020 deaths
All-American college men's basketball players
American expatriate basketball people in Italy
American expatriate basketball people in Spain
American men's basketball players
Basketball players from San Jose, California
California Golden Bears men's basketball players
CB Murcia players
Centers (basketball)
Kansas City Kings players
Libertas Liburnia Basket Livorno players
Liga ACB players
Los Angeles Lakers players
Orlando Magic players
Philadelphia 76ers draft picks
Philadelphia 76ers players
Power forwards (basketball)
Rapid City Thrillers players
Real Madrid Baloncesto players
San Antonio Spurs players
Santa Clara Broncos men's basketball players